The Battle of Kamalpur (কামালপুরের যুদ্ধ), launched against the Pakistan Army, is one of the most significant battles fought by Bangladesh Forces in 1971 during its war of independence from Pakistan. The Pakistan Army set up a military camp at Kamalpur (now in Baksiganj Upazila of Jamalpur District) which was attacked by 1st East Bengal Regiment of Z Force several times. The first attack was made on June 12, and a second attack was made on July 31, 1971. Finally, on December 4, Pakistan Army had to withdraw and fell back to their headquarters at Jamalpur after an attack by the Bangladesh Forces and Indian Army. In the aftermath of the battle, Pakistani troops were defeated and Jamalpur became free.

The Camp at Kamalpur

Kamalpur, a border area, was known as the gateway to Dhaka from the northern sector under Sector 11, the central sector and the largest one of Bangladesh Forces. It was situated on the mouth of the old Brahmaputra and on the road link with Mymensingh via Jamalpur. Pakistan Army set up a military camp at Kamalpur. This camp was tactically crucial for the Pakistan Army because its fall would cause the Pakistan Army to lose control over the whole Jamalpur-Dhaka region.

The Pakistani troops made concrete bunkers which contained shell proof roofs. To provide communication between bunkers, they dug communication trenches. The camp perimeter included Booby traps and minefields as defense.

About two companies of 31 regiment excluding razakars constituted the enemy force.

Attacks on Kamalpur Camp

On June 12, 1971, the first attack was launched by Z-forces at Kamalpur Camp. Pakistani troops tried to enter the villages of Sarishabari Upazila of Jamalpur district but failed as the villagers confronted them. Many people in the villages were killed. While retreating, the Pakistan Army set fire in the villages.

The second attack was led by Colonel (later Major General and President of Bangladesh) Ziaur Rahman on July 31, 1971. Zia was supported by Major Moinul Hossain and Captain Salauddin Mumtaz. The attack was made with two companies Delta and Bravo from the North – East of the enemy camp. Captain Salauddin Mumtaz commanded Delta on the left and Captain Hafiz commanded Bravo on the right. As the troops were moving towards the enemy post, the enemy artillery started firing heavily. As a result, the progress of the two companies became slow. The communication system collapsed because of heavy rain. However, the troops continued moving forward and entered the outer perimeter of the enemy camp. Though casualties were increasing, the freedom fighters made progress through the minefield. At one stage of the fight, two shells dropped in front of Captain Salauddin Mumtaz and killed him. In the morning at 7:30, Major Moin, the battalion commander of 1st East Bengal Regiment ordered the battalion to retreat.

See also
 Timeline of the Bangladesh Liberation War
 Military plans of the Bangladesh Liberation War
 Mitro Bahini order of battle
 Pakistan Army order of battle, December 1971
 Evolution of Pakistan Eastern Command plan
 1971 Bangladesh genocide
 Operation Searchlight
 Indo-Pakistani wars and conflicts

References

1971 in Bangladesh
Battles of the Bangladesh Liberation War
Battles of Indo-Pakistani wars
Mukti Bahini
1971 in India